Coogee may refer to:

Coogee, New South Wales, a suburb of Sydney
South Coogee, New South Wales, a suburb of Sydney
Electoral district of Coogee, an electoral district in the New South Wales Legislative Assembly
Coogee, Western Australia, a suburb of Perth, Western Australia